Wild Bill may refer to:

Places
 Wild Bill Lake, a lake in Montana

People

 Wild Bill Hickok (1837–1876), folk hero of the American Old West
 William L. Carlisle (1890–1964), train robber of the American West
 Wild Bill Claiborne (1872–1933), American college football player 
 Bill Clinton, former United States president referred to by Donald Trump as "Wild Bill"
 William Cutolo (1949–1999), New York mobster
 Wild Bill Davis (1918–1995), jazz organist
 Bill Davison (1906–1989), jazz cornet player
 William Edward Donovan (1876–1923), American professional baseball pitcher and manager
 William Joseph Donovan (1883–1959), American soldier, lawyer, and intelligence officer, founder of the precursor to the Central Intelligence Agency
 William O. Douglas (1898–1980), Supreme Court Justice
 Wild Bill Elliott (1904–1965), American actor who specialized in Western film roles
 Bill Elliott (born 1955), 1988 NASCAR Winston Cup Series Champion and twice Daytona 500 winner
 Wild Bill Gelbke (born 1938), American engineer and motorcycle designer
 William Guarnere (1923–2014), American soldier in the 101st Airborne during World War II, made famous by the mini-series Band of Brothers
 Wild Bill Hagy (1939–2007), American baseball fan who led cheers for the Baltimore Orioles
 Bill Hallahan (1902–1981), American baseball pitcher
 William Adams Wild Bill Hickman (1815–1883), frontiersman, ex-Mormon, and purported murderer
 Bill Hickok (American football) (1874–1933), American football player and businessman
 William Dathan Holbert (born 1979), American serial killer
 Bill Hunter (ice hockey) (1920–2002), Canadian hockey player, general manager and coach
 Wild Bill Irwin (born 1954), American professional wrestler
 William Karlsson (born 1993), Swedish professional ice hockey player 
 William Kocay, Canadian professor and graph theorist
 William Langer (1886–1959), governor and senator from North Dakota
 Bill Longley (gunfighter) (1851–1878), outlaw of the old American West
 Wild Bill Longson (1906–1982), American professional wrestler
 Bill Lovett (c. 1894–1923), Irish-American gangster in New York
 Wild Bill Luhrsen (1884–1973), American baseball pitcher
 Wild Bill Moore (1918–1983), American R&B and jazz saxophone player
 Wild Bill Shrewsberry (born 1938), American drag racer
 Bill Stealey (born 1947), retired U.S. Air Force pilot and computer game producer
 Wild Bill Widner (1867–1908), American baseball pitcher
 Billy Wiles (born 1971), an American professional wrestler

Arts, entertainment, and media
 Wild Bill (G.I. Joe), a fictional character in the G.I. Joe universe
 Wild Bill (1995 film), about the legendary gunfighter
 Wild Bill (2011 film), directorial debut of English actor Dexter Fletcher
 Wild Bill (TV series), a 2019 ITV television series

Lists of people by nickname